Jonas Fredrik Wirmola (born 17 July 1969) is a Swedish former football defender and manager and currently a player agent.

Playing career
Wirmola started his career at Kalmar FF and played for Väckelsångs IF, Vederslöv/Dänningelanda IF, Spårvägens FF, Öster and Spårvägens FF a second time.
In 1993, playing at the second tier of Swedish football, he was bought by Premier League club Sheffield United for £50k. He played only 8 league matches before returning to Sweden in 1994 to play for Malmö FF.

While at Malmö FF, he was loaned twice in 1997 to Scottish club Dundee United and Norwegian Skeid. In 2001, he joined IFK Malmö, his last club as a professional player. After starting his manager his career, he returned as a player twice for Högaborgs BK, a club he would later coach and BK Näset/Höllviken, a club he had been a manager at.

Retirement
Wirmola was appointed as IFK Malmö manager soon after retiring. He coached Höllvikens GIF, Högaborgs BK, BK Näset/Höllviken and was assistant at Halmstads BK, while also working as a pundit in the period. He later became a player agent.

Personal life
Wirmola has Finnish ancestry.

References

1969 births
Living people
Expatriate footballers in England
Expatriate footballers in Scotland
Expatriate footballers in Norway
Swedish footballers
Swedish expatriate footballers
Sheffield United F.C. players
Malmö FF players
Dundee United F.C. players
Allsvenskan players
Superettan players
Premier League players
Eliteserien players
Scottish Football League players
Swedish football managers
Skeid Fotball players
Högaborgs BK managers
Association football defenders
Swedish people of Finnish descent
People from Växjö
Sportspeople from Kronoberg County